The 1982–83 Kansas Jayhawks men's basketball team represented the University of Kansas during the 1982–83 NCAA Division I men's basketball season. They were coached by Ted Owens in his 19th and final season as head coach. The Jayhawks finished the season 13–16 and failed to qualify for the NCAA Tournament. The season remains, as of the 2022-23 season, the last season the Jayhawks had a losing season. It's also the last time that they failed to qualify for the NCAA Tournament for reasons other than disciplinary actions from the NCAA.

Roster
Carl Henry
Kerry Boagni
Kelly Knight
Calvin Thompson
Jeff Dishman
Ron Kellogg
Jeff Guiot
Brian Martin
Tad Boyle
Lance Hill
Mark Summers
Mark Ewing
Greg Dreiling
Tim Banks

Schedule

References

Kansas Jayhawks men's basketball seasons
Kansas
Kansas Jay
Kansas Jay